The Wormery is a Big Finish Productions audio drama based on the long-running British science fiction television series Doctor Who.

Plot
The Sixth Doctor investigates the mysterious bar known only as "Bianca's". Getting in his way is his old friend Iris Wildthyme, but this time she has a rival for the Doctor's affections — Bianca herself. With Iris getting drunk on Tequila, the Doctor must uncover Bianca's true identity and find out just who the voices are he and Iris keep hearing…

Cast
The Doctor — Colin Baker / Sylvester McCoy (Uncredited)
Iris Wildthyme — Katy Manning
Allis & Ballis — James Campbell
Sturmer — Mark Donovan
Heinrich — Jason Loborik
Bianca — Maria McErlane
Mickey — Jane MacFarlane

Notes
Iris Wildthyme previously played against the Fifth Doctor in Excelis Dawns as well as Bernice Summerfield in the related story The Plague Herds of Excelis.  She also has her own spin-off series, Iris Wildthyme; its theme song is an instrumental version of the number she sings in this story.
The Doctor comments about his recent experiences in The Trial of a Time Lord and elements of that story are reflected in this audio.
The "ask a glass of water" quote that the Doctor attributes to his friend "Douglas" is from The Hitchhiker's Guide to the Galaxy, written by former Doctor Who script editor, Douglas Adams.
The concept of a Time Ram was introduced in the classic series TV story The Time Monster.
Sylvester McCoy has a brief, uncredited cameo as the Seventh Doctor at the end of the story.

External links
Big Finish Productions – The Wormery

Iris Wildthyme audio plays
2003 audio plays
Sixth Doctor audio plays
Seventh Doctor audio plays
Plays by Stephen Cole
Plays by Paul Magrs
Doctor Who multi-Doctor stories